is a Japanese mixed-media project created by Noriyasu Agematsu, RUCCA, CyberAgent, Avex Pictures, and Elements Garden. A mobile game developed by WonderPlanet titled Technoroid Unison Heart was released on January 21, 2022 for Android and iOS, and an anime television series by Doga Kobo titled Technoroid Overmind premiered in January 2023.

Characters

KNoCC

Stand-Alone

Mechanicametallica

Others

Production and release
The mixed-media project by Noriyasu Agematsu, RUCCA, CyberAgent, Avex Pictures, and Elements Garden was announced on November 2, 2021, with a mobile game developed by WonderPlanet titled  released on January 21, 2022 for Android and iOS, as well as an anime television series by Doga Kobo titled . Ka Hee Im is directing the series, with Ai Yoshimura supervising, Ayumi Sekine penning the series' scripts, Saori Sakiguchi designing the characters based on the original designs by LAM, and Elements Garden and RUCCA composing the series' music. It was initially scheduled for July 2022, but was later delayed as Doga Kobo was temporarily closed due to an increase of COVID-19 infections among its staff members. The series premiered on January 5, 2023, on TV Tokyo and other networks. The opening theme song is "Love No Hate" by KNoCC, while the ending theme song is "Invisible -one heart-" by KNoCC and Stand-Alone. Crunchyroll licensed the series.

A manga adaptation by Ageha Saotome also began serialization on the AlphaPolis service on January 5, 2023.

References

External links
Project official website 

2022 video games
2023 anime television series debuts
Adventure games
Android (operating system) games
Anime postponed due to the COVID-19 pandemic
Climate change in fiction
Crunchyroll anime
Doga Kobo
IOS games
Japan-exclusive video games
Japanese role-playing video games
Mobile games
Music in anime and manga
Music video games
Puzzle video games
Shōnen manga
TV Tokyo original programming
Video games developed in Japan